Siobhan Drake-Brockman (born 7 April 1978) is a former professional tennis player from Australia. She won the girls' singles title at the 1995 Australian Open.

Biography
Drake-Brockman, a right-handed player out of Bunbury, Western Australia, attended St Hilda's Anglican School in Perth and was a member of the Australian team which won the World Youth Cup in 1993.

At the age of 16 she defeated world number 61 Rachel McQuillan to win a $25,000 ITF tournament in Port Pirie in 1994.

She made her WTA Tour main draw debut in one of the opening tournaments of the 1995 season, the Tasmanian International, held in Hobart. At the 1995 Australian Open she was granted a wildcard into the women's singles and made the second round, with a win over Japanese qualifier Naoko Kijimuta. She then won the Australian Open girls' singles title, by beating World Youth Cup teammate Annabel Ellwood in the final.

In 1996 she made the second round again at the Australian Open and competed that year mostly on the ITF circuit.

She had her best season in 1997 when her ranking rose to a career high 109 in the world, with appearances in the main draws of WTA Tour tournaments in Hobart, Birmingham, Stanford, San Diego and Surabaya.

Retiring from tennis in 1998, Drake-Brockman has a law degree from the University of Western Australia and works as a contracts engineer in Perth.

ITF Circuit finals

Singles (1–2)

Doubles (1–1)

References

External links
 
 

1978 births
Living people
Australian female tennis players
Australian Open (tennis) junior champions
Tennis people from Western Australia
People from Bunbury, Western Australia
Sportswomen from Western Australia
University of Western Australia alumni
Grand Slam (tennis) champions in girls' singles